The Sweet Adelines International Competitions are the annual global championships for women's barbershop harmony a cappella singing – in quartets and choruses – for members of Sweet Adelines International (SAI) and have been held annually between September and November since 1947. They are now the largest women's singing competition in the world with over 8000 participants at the 2014 convention. There are two competitions for choruses (the international championships and the "Harmony Classic" for smaller choruses), and two competitions for quartets (the international championships and the "Rising Star" for young singers). Currently, the first three of these competitions are held together and form the Sweet Adelines International Convention. Over the course of competition history, the most successful chorus has been Melodeers Chorus from Chicago with seven championship titles, and the most successful quartet singer was Connie Noble who won with four separate quartets. Lustre Quartet from Baltimore holds the record for highest quartet score, and Rönninge Show Chorus from Stockholm for highest ever chorus score.

History
The first convention was held in Tulsa, Oklahoma in 1947 for quartets – two years after the foundation of the first Sweet Adelines Inc. chapter in the city. The competition was expanded to include choruses in 1973 and in 2000 the Harmony Classic competition for small and medium-sized choruses was introduced. Originally, Harmony Classic was held independently but since 2009 all three are now hosted together and run over the course of the convention week. A fourth event, the "Rising Star" competition, was introduced in 1999 for quartets whose members are under-25 years old. It was also held as part of convention from 2009 until 2012 but due to scheduling and cost constraints is now held independently again. Many non-competitive performances are also held during convention week, including by the previous year's chorus and quartet champions.

The convention is usually held in a city in the continental United States but has thrice been held internationally (England 1977, Canada 1962, 2007) and four times in Hawaii (1969, 1987, 2008, 2013). A "spectacular fifty-year anniversary celebration" was held in New Orleans during the 1995 convention and the competition was to be held there a decade later in 2005, but was moved due to Hurricane Katrina. From 2015 to 2017, the city of Las Vegas hosted the convention – the first time that the event has stayed in the same location for more than one year. The 2020 "75th Diamond Anniversary" convention is expected to be the first use of the newly renovated Kentucky International Convention Center in Louisville, Kentucky – expecting to draw 10,000 attendees. Since 2004, the competition has been livestreamed over the internet as a popular donation-funded webcast, operated by an in-house media production team.

In recent years, the formal events of convention week proceed as follows:

Qualifying
The competitions held during international convention each have a different qualification processes:For choruses, the highest scoring chorus of each SAI regional competition qualifies directly for the following year's SAI international competition semi-final. For example, the winner of a regional competition in 2014 is granted entry as their region's representative to the 2015 competition. If that chorus cannot compete, the second-placed chorus is offered the place. There are 28 active regions numbered 1–35 (some have been merged with others over time) although a region is not obliged to hold a regional competition every year. A chorus may not compete in a regional competition in the year that they are also qualified to compete in the international competition. This rule ensures that one chorus does not monopolise their region's attendance to the international competition. In addition to the direct-qualifying places, since 2002 "wildcard" places are awarded to the highest-scoring second-placed choruses across all regional competitions making it possible for a region to have two representatives at internationals in one year. Initially four wildcard places were made available, subsequently increased to 10. Wildcards ensures that a high scoring chorus is not unfairly excluded from international competition due to being in a highly competitive region.

Qualification for the Harmony Classic competition happens as part of the regional chorus competition. The five highest-scoring small (division A, fewer than 30 singers) and midsize (division, AA 31–60 singers) choruses across all regional competitions qualify directly for the Harmony Classic of the following year. With five choruses in each of the two divisions (A & AA) a total of 10 choruses compete in this competition each year. Only one chorus from a region may compete in each of the divisions and a chorus may not compete in the same division again two years in a row. Furthermore, a chorus may not compete in both the main competition and also the Harmony Classic at the same year. A chorus may potentially qualify for both the main chorus competition and the Harmony Classic, but are only permitted to compete in one, thereby making a space available for the next highest qualifier to take their place at the other competition.

For quartets, qualification proceeds in much the same manner as for choruses – with regional winners and wildcard places. The regional qualification process happens in the same calendar year as the international competition (not the preceding year as is the case with choruses). Furthermore, quartets that obtain a ranking of 2nd to 15th place at the previous year's international competition are considered to have pre-qualified for the following international competition and are offered a direct place in the semi-final if they wish without the requirement to compete in their regional competition. This means that the total number of competing quartets is higher than the chorus competition.

A chorus may win many international competitions or Harmony Classic competitions over the years, but may not compete at the international level two years in a row. In contrast, a quartet may compete at the international competition many times in succession, but must retire from all SAI quartet competitions if it wins, although the quartet may participate in a regional competition for evaluation. Quartets performing for evaluation receive a scoresheet with comments and grade, but are not awarded a score and are not eligible for awards.

There is no formal qualification process for the Rising Star competition; rather, an eligible quartet registers their interest. A quartet may compete at the Rising Star competition several years in succession, provided all its members remain under the 25-year age limit, but winning quartets may not compete in the Rising Star competition again.

Scoring
Both choruses and quartets are judged according to four categories:
 Sound: judging mastery of vocal skills, tuning of chords, delivery of vowels with matched resonance, "Barbershop balance", vocal lines, artistry and finesse.
 Music: judging creative arrangement of a barbershop style song, timing of chords, and execution of interpretive plan.
 Expression: judging matched open vowels, diction, execution of interpretive plan, use of barbershop style and vocal drama, and emotional communication.
 Visual Communication: judging command of the stage, theatrical skill and projection of character, audience captivation, performance energy, and the visual plan.
For all categories, judges are also scoring for whether "mastery of vocal skills [is] demonstrated" and whether the "performance transcends technique".

In scoring both the semi-final and the final, penalties may be applied for a variety of rules including time-limits, not singing competition-songs in American English, the use of musical instruments, singing religious or patriotic songs and "misconduct".

In regional competitions, there is one round of competition and each category is scored by one judge. Therefore,:

Regional competition: 4 categories x 1 judge each x 2 songs, maximum 100 points per judge = maximum possible 800 points.

At international competition, the number of judges for each category is doubled (making eight judges in total). Consequently, the maximum possible score in each round of international competition is also doubled to 1600.

Until 1985, there were three rounds of competition for quartets (quarter-final for all qualifiers, semi-final for the top 20, and final for the top 10) and only one round of competition for choruses (the final). Therefore, the perfect score was 4800 for a quartet and 1600 for a chorus. From 1985 the two competitions' structures were standardised to the semi-final/final format (semi-final for all qualifiers, final for the top 5) This set the new perfect score for both choruses and quartets at 3200. Two years later in 1987, a maximum of 80 "bonus points" were added in the final round (10 per judge) for scoring the performance "package" in both the quartet and chorus competitions, raising the maximum score to 3280. Two years after that in 1989, the quartet competition re-introduced the quarter-final with a reduced score (20 per judge) but retaining the bonus points system in the final. This increased the quartet perfect score to 3440 while the chorus competition continued without change. In 1998 the two systems were standardised again with the quartet competition returning to the format introduced in 1987, but with the size of the final round for choruses and quartets doubled to 10 contestants. Following a further rule change, from the 2015 competition the "bonus points" were removed, reducing the perfect score back to the 1985 standard of 3200.

In the regional and semi-final competitions, each contestant must perform two songs – normally an "up-tune" and a ballad – in the order of their choice. The combined times of both songs must be no longer than 7 minutes. In the final round of competition, choruses and quartets are allowed between 12 and 15 minutes to perform. Rather than a strict two-song performance, choruses must perform a "package" of approximately 4 songs with a narrative or theme tying the package together and spoken interludes (known as "emcee material"). In the chorus competition props, costume changes, medley/mashup choral arrangements, and elaborate (even gymnastic) choreography moves are also common. As a consolation prize, the 11th ranked chorus or quartet is invited to perform their own package at the beginning of the final round as the "mic[rophone] testers". As with the semi-finals, the final-round performance order of appearance is randomly allocated.

Within the finals package, from 1985 until 2014, quartets and choruses were still expected to perform two "competition songs" (one "up-tune" and one ballad) which would be scored in the same manner as the semi-finals as well as their package (which would attract potential "bonus points"). From 2015, quartets and choruses are only required to perform one formally judged competition song in the finals (their choice of either an "up-tune" or a ballad), with the remainder of the score judging their finals package as a whole.

The score sheet itself contains lengthy hand written notes by each of the judges giving the contestant information on what the judges heard (and saw) to justify their score and also ways to improve. The visual layout of the scorecards have changed from year to year, but an example of how of a performer's semi-final scorecard from international competition appears is as follows (equally applicable to a chorus or quartet):

C# refers to "contestant number" i.e. the order of appearance.

# refers to "number [on stage]" i.e. the size of the chorus, relevant for calculating the "harmony achievement" award.

Pty refers to "penalty" i.e. the number of points deducted, if any.

Place refers to the ranking of the chorus compared to all other competitors' total scores.

Note that because the semi-final and final scores are cumulative, it can occur that the highest scoring chorus in the final does not win the championship because another chorus had a higher cumulative score. Semi-final scores are given to all choruses after the performance except for the top-10 choruses who qualified for the final competition. Their semi-final (and therefore the semi-final rankings) are kept secret until after the end of the competition.

Because of the complexity of the scoring system, to more easily group competitive performances score ranges are often referred to by a "performance level" – starting at the perfect score (represented by A+) and concluding at F. Due to the differing number of judges (and therefore differing scores) between regional and international competition the "level" system allows for easier comparison. These ranges are as follows:

Awards

The singers of the top-10 placed choruses and quartets in the main competitions are awarded medals with a designated color. They are designated the International Champion Chorus/Quartet for the next calendar year. As the current title holders, the winners are permitted to wear these medals around their neck on a ribbon of the same color until the following year's competition. At this point they must be removed from the colored ribbon. Longstanding members of Sweet Adelines International may end up earning many awards at both regional and international competitions. Customarily these are worn as a group in a manner similar to military service ribbons, often attached to the chest with a brooch-like clasp.

In addition, international quartet champions are awarded a tiara or crown each – every year of a different design – and are proclaimed "Queens of Harmony", this title having been in use since at least 1960. They are entitled to wear their crown at any future SAI event, even when they are not the current champions. However, they are not allowed to compete as that quartet again. The association of past quartet winners is known as the "Coronet Club".

In the chorus competition, in addition to the placings, the "Harmony Achievement award" has been presented since 1991. This recognises the chorus that achieved the highest score, despite having relatively fewer singers on stage. The formula for calculating the largest chorus eligible for the award is: "Total number of performers on stage at any time, including directors, divided by the number of contestants, multiplied by 80%".

Certified directors of any chorus which attains more than 600 points at regional competition (or 1200 points at international, excluding bonus points) are entitled to be called a "master director" or, for those whose chorus achieves more than 700 (1400 at international), "master director 700".

Chorus competition

Champions
Until 1984, there was only one round of competition; from 1985, there are two round which increases the total score. Equally, from 2015 no "bonus points" are awarded in the final round, reducing the total score. The % column accounts for this change in maximum score to allow for comparison between years with different scoring systems. The Harmony Achievement award was introduced in 1991.

The list of champion choruses and related information is as follows. Note, some choruses have changed region in the years after their winning the competition. The region listed is the region that the chorus represented that year.

Chorus is now defunct, has merged with another chorus, or has changed name.

Until 1985, only round of competition was held. As a result, the grand-total score of the winner for earlier years is lower than competitions from 1985-onwards where two rounds of scores (semi-final and final) make up the grand total. For full details of scoring changes see the scoring section above. Direct comparisons of scores in different eras are possible using the % column.

Until 2015, 10 bonus points were available in the final round per-song per-judge (80 points in total). Removing these reduced the possible grand total from 3280 to 3200. Direct comparisons of scores in different eras are possible using the % column.

Results by year

The results of the most recent chorus competition are included below.

Chorus records

Most successful choruses
The most successful choruses over time are as follows. Choruses are ranked according to the gold first system but can be sorted to rank according to total number of top-three appearances. Some choruses have changed region over time, the chorus's current region is listed here.

Highest ever regional scores
The highest 30 scores ever achieved at any regional competition as of 2018 competitions are as follows.

Highest regional score by region
The highest score ever achieved in each individual region's competition as of 2018 is as follows:

Harmony Classic

Champions

Before 2009 the Harmony Classic competition was hosted independently from the other SAI competitions, but since 2009 it has been held in parallel, and at the same location.

Eligibility for Division AA (medium) is for choruses with between 31 and 60 singers on stage, while Division A (small) is for those with between 15 and 30 singers. The list of Harmony Classic competition winners is as follows:

Results by year

The results of the most recent Harmony Classic competition are:

Quartet competition

Champions
From the competition's inception to the 1992 edition, the winning quartet was named champion of the year that they competed in. From the 1993 competition onwards the designation was changed to the following year – the one in which they primarily held their position. Thus, the winners of the competition held in November 2014 (Bling! quartet) were proclaimed the "2015 queens of harmony".

As with the Chorus competition, all competitors compete in the "semi-final" round from which the top 10 compete a few days later in the final round. The scores for the top 10 are added together to make the grand total which determines the winner. Until 1984 all competitors began at the "quarter-final" stage, the top 20 progress to the semi-final, and the top 10 progressing to the final. From 1985 this three-level system was dropped back to simply semi-final and final. However, because the earlier winners competed in three rounds, their grand total scores are correspondingly larger. The % column accounts for this change in maximum score to allow for comparison between years with different scoring systems.

The international champion quartet, performers names, and score for each year of competition are as follows.

Replacement quartet members must participate with a quartet for at least three years. They may earn a gold medal after that time if the quartet makes the request on her behalf for one and the Coronet Club and International Board approve it." The replaced quartet member is marked with an asterisk *

Note, some sources differ as to the inclusion of the definite article in many of the earlier quartets' names.

Until 1985 a quarter-final round was held as well as a semi-final and final. The winner's scores for these three rounds were added together, making for a higher grand total than later years when only two rounds of scores (semi-final and final) make up the grand total. In 1987 "bonus points" were introduced in the final round. From 1989 to 1997 the quarter-final was reintroduced at a lower score value. For full details of scoring changes see the scoring section above. Direct comparisons of scores in different eras are possible using the % column.

From 1989 to 1997 the official scoresheet includes bonus points in the final and grand total but does not account for them in the official %. The % marked here does account for the bonus points for the sake of consistency.

From 1993 onwards the Queens' official year designation was changed to reflect the year following their win rather than the year in which the competition was held.

Until 2015 bonus points were available in the final round. Removing these reduced the possible grand total. Direct comparisons of scores in different eras are possible using the % column.

UnderAge, the 2005 winners of the Rising Star competition, won the 2013 international quartet competition performing as LoveNotes.

Results by year

The results of the most recent competition are included below.

Quartet records

Most international championships
Although a quartet is not allowed to win more than one international competition, individuals from winning quartets are permitted to join a new quartet and compete again. As of 2016, 21 people have won "dual crowns" by singing in two champion quartets, one person has won three crowns, and one person has won four times. Several winners have changed their surname by marriage in between wins; this table lists their current name followed by the name(s) they had in their championship year (in brackets). The "international champions" table, above, lists the competitor's name at that time.

Highest ever regional scores
Quartets can contain members who are registered in different regions, in which case all their regions are listed. The regional competition in which they achieved their high score is marked in bold. The highest 30 scores ever achieved at any regional competition as of 2019 are as follows:

Highest regional score by region
The highest score ever achieved in each individual region's competition as of 2019 are as follows:

Rising Star
This quartet competition, also known as the Young Women in Harmony (YWIH) competition, is open to women under 25 years old.

Initially run as part of SAI's annual "International Education Symposium", from 2009 the competition was held as part of the international convention week. However, in 2013 it was decided to return to operating the competition separately due to the expense and scheduling difficulty of fitting in with the other convention events. The event was not run that year and from 2014 is held in conjunction with a regional competition.

Though it follows a simplified version of the main quartet competition scoring system, the YWIH the scoring system has changed several times – both in the potential maximum score and the strictness of the grading:
 In the 1999 inaugural year, four judges each gave scores out of 200 (totalling 800) and graded to the same level as normal competition
 From 2000 to 2002, no scores were given at all, only ranks
 In 2003 and 2004, four judges each gave scores out of 50 (totalling 200) and were more generous in the grading
 Since 2005, four judges each give scores out of 50 for two songs (totalling 400).

The list of Rising Star champions is as follows:

See also
 List of Barbershop Harmony Society chorus champions
 List of Barbershop Harmony Society quartet champions

References

Sources
Sweet Adelines International homepage
 
competition records
 
Barbershophistory.com homepage
historical chorus results
competition records
Barbershop Wiki Project homepage
SAI international convention
Sweet Adelines Scores Yahoo! Group [registration required]
Barbershop Harmony Society homepage
 

 
Barbershop music
Music-related lists
Timelines of music